In geometry, the great snub dodecicosidodecahedron (or great snub dodekicosidodecahedron) is a nonconvex uniform polyhedron, indexed as U64. It has 104 faces (80 triangles and 24 pentagrams), 180 edges, and 60 vertices. It has Coxeter diagram, . It has the unusual feature that its 24 pentagram faces occur in 12 coplanar pairs.

Related polyhedra 

It shares its vertices and edges, as well as 20 of its triangular faces and all its pentagrammic faces, with the great dirhombicosidodecahedron, (although the latter has 60 edges not contained in the great snub dodecicosidodecahedron). It shares its other 60 triangular faces (and its pentagrammic faces again) with the great disnub dirhombidodecahedron.

The edges and triangular faces also occur in the compound of twenty octahedra. In addition, 20 of the triangular faces occur in one enantiomer of the compound of twenty tetrahemihexahedra, and the other 60 triangular faces occur in the other enantiomer.

Gallery

See also 
 List of uniform polyhedra

References

External links 
 

Uniform polyhedra